Indiantown is a village in Martin County, Florida, United States. The population was 6,560 at the 2020 census. It is a rural community in the interior of Florida's Treasure Coast region, first established in the early 1900s, then incorporated on December 31, 2017. The village is governed by a mayor and council elected at-large, while day-to-day operations are directed by the village manager.

History

Indiantown was originally established by the Seminole people as a trading post. Tribes fleeing southwards from the U.S. Army after the First Seminole War found the area an attractive place to settle due to a relatively higher elevation and ample hunting and fishing spots. It was then settled by white American migrants in the 1890s.

In 1924, Indiantown was transformed when S. Davies Warfield built an extension of the Seaboard Air Line Railroad from Coleman, Florida, to West Palm Beach, passing directly through—and stopping in—Indiantown.

Warfield planned to make Indiantown the southern hub of the Seaboard rail line. Toward that end, he planned a model city, laying out streets and building a school, housing, and a railroad station. Warfield also built the Seminole Inn, which is now on the National Register of Historic Places.

The Florida land boom of the 1920s fizzled out after 1926. Warfield died a year later, putting an end to plans to make Indiantown the Seaboard's southern headquarters. The 1928 Okeechobee hurricane wreaked significant destruction and halted further development.

A serious effort to revitalize the local economy began in 1952 when the Indiantown Development Corporation was sold and restructured as the Indiantown Company. The company was involved in the construction of new water and sewage systems, housing developments, docks making use of the St. Lucie River, and a  airstrip for bringing in small cargo and civilian air traffic.

In the 1950s and 1960s, Indiantown was home to the Circle T Ranch and its Circle T Rodeo Bowl. The 1963 rodeo event drew approximately 15,000 visitors, making it the largest tourist attraction in Florida at the time. The ranch was later bought out and turned into a filming studio.

Seaboard trains continued to stop at the Indiantown depot through the 1960s, but passenger service to the station was eliminated when Amtrak took over in 1971. The depot was demolished several years later. The Seminole Inn is virtually all that remains of the 1920s boom.

Warfield's contributions to Indiantown are memorialized in, among others, Warfield Boulevard (the main route through Indiantown) and Warfield Elementary School.

Currently, the economy of Indiantown relies heavily on seasonal agriculture. The town also continues to make use of its position near the intersections of many major roads to act as a transportation and infrastructure hub. There are also attempts to take advantage of nearby natural wetlands and to revitalize the rodeo in order to draw in tourists.

Geography
Indiantown is located in western Martin County at  (27.0263, –80.4728).

The town's southern border is the St. Lucie Canal, connecting Lake Okeechobee with the St. Lucie River near Stuart.

Demographics

2020 census

As of the 2020 United States census, there were 6,560 people, 1,841 households, and 1,503 families residing in the village.

2000 census
As of the census of 2000, there were 5,588 people, 1,648 households, and 1,264 families residing in the Village. The racial makeup of the Village was 45.92% White, 20.99% African American, 2.29% Native American, 0.20% Asian, 0.97% Pacific Islander, 26.54% from other races, and 3.10% from two or more races. Hispanic or Latino of any race were 48.93% of the population.

There were 1,648 households, out of which 33.7% had children under the age of 18 living with them, 54.9% were married couples living together, 13.7% had a female householder with no husband present, and 23.3% were non-families. 17.2% of all households were made up of individuals, and 9.9% had someone living alone who was 65 years of age or older. The average household size was 3.39 and the average family size was 3.59.

In the Village, the population was spread out, with 31.2% under the age of 18, 11.4% from 18 to 24, 25.6% from 25 to 44, 15.7% from 45 to 64, and 16.2% who were 65 years of age or older. The median age was 30 years. For every 100 females, there were 123.0 males. For every 100 females age 18 and over, there were 123.2 males.

The median income for a household in the Village was $28,977, and the median income for a family was $30,675. Males had a median income of $17,810 versus $19,063 for females. The per capita income for the Village was $11,085. About 18.8% of families and 23.8% of the population were below the poverty line, including 31.3% of those under age 18 and 7.0% of those age 65 or over.

Government
The Village of Indiantown was incorporated on December 31, 2017, by special state legislation. Indiantown is a Village located in Martin County, governed by a village council of five. The Village of Indiantown has a council-manager form of government. The Village of Indiantown selected their first permanent village manager on December 17, 2018.

Public transportation
Indiantown is served by a shuttle around the city, operated by Martin County.

Payson Park
Indiantown is the home of Payson Park, one of the top thoroughbred horse racing facilities in the United States. Among the trainers with their champion horses who have participated in this event are William Mott, Christophe Clement, Roger Attfield, Shug McGaughey, John Kimmel, and Tom Albertrani. Monkees frontman Davy Jones also kept a stable of Thoroughbred horses in Indiantown, and it was here that he died in 2012 on Leap Year Day.

Notable people
 Charles Emanuel, professional football player
 Cleveland Gary, professional football player
 Davy Jones, musician and actor from The Monkees
 Corey McIntyre, professional football player
 Patrick Sheltra, 2010 ARCA Racing Series racing champion

Notes

References

 McIver, Stuart B. (1994), Dreamers, Schemers and Scalawags. Sarasota, Florida: Pineapple Press, Inc. 

Port St. Lucie metropolitan area
Former municipalities in Florida
Villages in Florida